Sonni Ogbuoji is a Nigerian politician who was elected Senator for Ebonyi South, in Ebonyi State, Nigeria in the 9 April 2011 national elections. He was elected on the People's Democratic Party (PDP) ticket. He left the senate in the 2019. Sonni hails from Ebunwana Edda in Afikpo South local government area of Ebonyi state.

Ogbuoji was the local government chairman of Afikpo local government area during the military regime before the start of the Nigerian Fourth Republic.

Ogbuoji was Commissioner for Economic Empowerment and Poverty Reduction in the government of Martin Elechi.
In this role he supervised construction and stocking of 35 catfish ponds in an effort to provide youth employment.
In November 2010 Ogbuoji, resigned from this post. 
He remained the Ebonyi coordinator for the Goodluck / Sambo Presidential campaign.

Ogbuoji won 65,735 votes in the April 2011 senatorial election for Ebonyi South.  
Idu Igariwey of the All Nigeria Peoples Party (ANPP) followed with 16,501 and Darlington Okere of the Action Congress of Nigeria (ACN) got 11,602.

Birth and Education 
He was born on 29 September 1954 to late Mr. Ogbu Nnachi Oji and Mrs. Mary Mai Oji of Ebunwana, Afikpo South (Edda) LGA, Ebonyi State and attended Edda Central School, Ebunwana between 1964 and 1970. He attended Government College Umuahia, between 1971 and 1975 and University of Nigeria, Nsukka, between 1976 and 1981 with bachelor's degree in Agriculture.

Politics and Public Office 
Elected Chairman of old Afikpo Local Government (Afikpo North and South)
Elected pioneer Chairman of Afikpo South LGA  1991-1993
National Publicity Secretary of the defunct GDM (1996-1998).
Chairman of Ebonyi State Secondary Education Board 2003-2006
Member, Ebonyi State Committee on Vision 20:20:20 (2009)
Commissioner for Economic Empowerment and Poverty Reduction 2009
Senator representing Ebonyi South (2011-2015)
Second Term Senator (2015-2019)
Board member, Nigerian Shippers’ Council (NSC)
Board member, Nigerian Geological Survey Agency (NGSA)
In the Senate
Vice Chairman: Senate Committees on Appropriations and Special Duties 
Membership: Agriculture, Education, Defence, Air Force, Foreign Affairs, Poverty Alleviation, Senate Services, SDGs, States and Local Governments.

Awards/Chieftaincy Recognitions 
Fellow of Technology by Akanu Ibiam Federal Polytechnic Unwana, Fellow of Technology by Akanu Ibiam Federal Polytechnic Unwana
Vocational Service Award by Rotary Club of AfikpoMerit Award by Nigerian Institute of Animal Science
Ebonyi Ambassador by Ebonyi Professionals Forum
Award of Excellence by National Association of Imo State Students
U.IMerit Award by Animal Science Association of Nigeria, South East Zone1
Omeudo  of Amangwu Edda (Peace Maker)
Agubata of Umunna Edda (Strength of a Lion)
Ochioha of Oso and Ebunwana Edda (Leader of the people)
Enyioha of Etiti Edda (Friend of the Masses)
Onioku  of Oziza, Afikpo (The giver of light)
Omereoha  of Akpoha, Afikpo (The Philanthropist)
Ife Edda  The light of Edda people

Personal 
Ogbuoji enjoys playing the tennis, travelling and reading. He is married to Scholastica Ugo Ogbuoji and has two sons.

See also
 List of people from Ebonyi State

References

1954 births
Living people
Peoples Democratic Party members of the Senate (Nigeria)
University of Nigeria alumni
Igbo politicians
Peoples Democratic Party (Nigeria) politicians
Government College Umuahia alumni
Academic staff of Akanu Ibiam Federal Polytechnic